The Bismarck ringed python (Bothrochilus boa) is a species of snake in the genus Bothrochilus found on the islands of the Bismarck Archipelago. No subspecies are recognized.

Description
The color pattern consists of a series of brilliant orange and black rings in juveniles, but this fades in about a year as the snakes mature. Adults are usually a shade of brown with black rings, or a uniform blackish brown. Usually, there is a light spot behind the eye. Some specimens may have black rings that are irregular, incompletely formed or even absent. The scales are highly iridescent.

Distribution and habitat
Found on the islands of the Bismarck Archipelago, including Umboi, New Britain, Gasmata (off the southern coast), Duke of York and nearby Mioko, New Ireland and nearby Tatau (off the east coast), the New Hanover Islands and Nissan Island, the type locality given is "Nouvelle Irlande" (New Ireland). The Bismarck ringed python inhabits rain forests in open and/or cultivated areas, and is often found in piles of coconut husks.

Behavior
These snakes are nocturnal and fossorial.

Feeding
Their diet consists primarily of small rodents, for which they actively forage. They have been reported to enter houses and agricultural structures in search of prey. Hatchlings feed on lizards and juvenile rodents.

Reproduction
Oviparous, they lay up to a dozen eggs that are generally "brooded" by the female, although this is not always the case.

References

External links

 

Bothrochilus
Reptiles of Papua New Guinea
Snakes of Asia
Taxa named by Leopold Fitzinger
Reptiles described in 1837